Paul Esser (24 April 1913 – 20 January 1988) was a German stage and television actor and voice actor.  He is remembered for playing the lead role in the Sender Freies Berlin version of the detective series Tatort. Esser was born in Geldern-Kapellen and died in Tenerife.

Selected filmography

 The Gasman (1941)
 Liebesgeschichten (1943) - Oskar - 20 Jahre
 Rotation (1949) - Hans Behnke
 Der Kahn der fröhlichen Leute (1950) - Heinrich, Musiker
 The Merry Wives of Windsor (1950) - Sir John Falstaff (Johannes Spenser)
 Heart of Stone (1950) - Ezechiel
 Man of Straw (1951) - Regierungspräsident von Wulckow
 Homesick for You (1952) - Otto Klemke
 Christina (1953) - Fritz Ohlsen, Knecht
 The Immortal Vagabond (1953) - Florian
 A Life for Do (1954) - Onkel Karl
 Prisoners of Love (1954) - Max
 Hoheit lassen bitten (1954) - Bauunternehmer Kehlbach
 Island of the Dead (1955) - Fritz Kahlmayer
 Son Without a Home (1955) - Ludwig Steiner
 Your Life Guards (1955) - Oberst
 Urlaub auf Ehrenwort (1955) - Offc. Paul Hartmann
 Johannisnacht (1956) - Verwalter Lamm
 Das Hirtenlied vom Kaisertal (1956) - Der Pfarrer
 Different from You and Me (1957) - Kommissar
 The Spessart Inn (1957) - Friedrich Roeckel
 Precocious Youth (1957) - Herr Messmann
 The Spessart Inn (1958) - Corporal
 The Gambler (1958)
 Restless Night (1958) - Zahlmeister
 Der Schinderhannes (1958) - Schmied Schauwecker
 For Love and Others (1959) - Hauptwachtmeister Siegel (Episode Hamburg)
 The Beautiful Adventure (1959) - Olivon
 Two Times Adam, One Time Eve (1959) - Rat Granberg
 Abschied von den Wolken (1959) - Monsignore Scarpi
 Ein Herz braucht Liebe (1960)
 Yes, Women are Dangerous (1960) - Kapitän Friedrichsen
  (1960) - Obergefreiter Karl
 The Haunted Castle (1960) - Toni, a ghost
  (1963) - J. M. Schreiber
 Wochentags immer (1963) - Onkel
 Das Haus auf dem Hügel (1964) - Inspektor Antoine Creux
 Not Reconciled (1965)
 Glorious Times at the Spessart Inn (1967) - Mönch
 La moglie giapponese (1968) - Ferrante
 If It's Tuesday, This Must Be Belgium (1969) - German Sergeant
 Pippi Longstocking (1969, TV Series) - Blom
 Pippi Longstocking (1969) - Bloom
  (1969) - Richter (uncredited)
  (1969) - Max
 Pippi Goes on Board (1969) - Blom
 What Is the Matter with Willi? (1970) - Motzmann
 Daughters of Darkness (1971) - Hotel clerk
 Our Willi Is the Best (1971) - Herr Kaiser
 Emil i Lönneberga (1971) - Doktorn
 Nya hyss av Emil i Lönneberga (1972) - Doktorn
  (1973)
 Tatort (1971-1974, TV Series) - Gastkommissar Kasulke
 The Roaring Fifties (1983) - Senator Hilton

References

1913 births
1988 deaths
German male television actors
German male stage actors
German male voice actors
20th-century German male actors